Hemmert is a surname. Notable people with the surname include:

 Dan Hemmert, American businessman and politician
 Terri Hemmert (born 1948), American radio personality, musicologist, and instructor

See also
 Hemmer